Stade Municipal de Mbour or Stade Caroline Faye is a multi-use stadium in M'Bour, Senegal.  It is currently used mostly for football matches and serves as a home ground of Stade Mbour. The stadium holds 5,000 people.

Municipal de Mbour